Proposition 1 or Prop 1 may refer to:

US state propositions
 California Proposition 1
 Idaho Proposition 1
 New York Proposition 1
 Texas Proposition 1

US local propositions
 2015 Houston, Texas Proposition 1